Remplin is a village and a former municipality in the Mecklenburgische Seenplatte district, in Mecklenburg-Vorpommern, Germany. Since 7 June 2009, it is part of the municipality Malchin.

Palace Complex
The town includes the remains of a once large palace complex, the Schloss Remplin, which served as the summer home of a member of the Mecklenburg-Strelitz family who lived in Russia, and then as the main residence of the Mecklenburg-Strelitz family until 1940, when it was destroyed by fire. After 1940 the family moved to Berlin and then after World war two, as with every other royal family who held land in what would become East Germany, ended up losing everything they had to the Soviets. After restitution agreements in 2004, some of the surviving palace complex was returned to the family, albeit in terrible condition.

Notable people 

 Duke Georg Alexander of Mecklenburg-Strelitz, prince of the House of Mecklenburg-Strelitz and Major General in the Russian army

References

External links 

Villages in Mecklenburg-Western Pomerania